Pachycentria is a genus of epiphytic or terrestrial shrubs that grow up to 2.5 m tall, or rarely small trees up to 8 m
tall, indigenous to Burma, Thailand, Peninsular Malaysia, Sumatra, Java, Borneo, Philippines, Sulawesi, and New Guinea.

Accepted species names, as of April 2021, include:

Pachycentria constricta 
Pachycentria glauca 
Pachycentria hanseniana 
Pachycentria microsperma 
Pachycentria microstyla 
Pachycentria pulverulenta 
Pachycentria varingaefolia 
Pachycentria vogelkopensis

References

 Pachycentria Blume, Flora 14 (1831) 519.
 Revision of Pachycentria (Melastomataceae), Gudrun Clausing, BLUMEA 45 (2000) 341–375.
 

 
Melastomataceae genera